Kahnu Charan Lenka also spelt Kanu is  an Indian politician. He was elected to the Rajya Sabha, upper house of the Parliament of India from Odisha. He was the Minister for State for Railways and Union Minister of State for Agriculture Under Narasimha Rao. He was earlier elected to the Odisha Legislative Assembly and an Odisha state minister.

References

1939 births
Rajya Sabha members from Odisha
People from Odisha
Living people